Andrej Đurić (born 21 September 2003) is a Serbian footballer who plays as a defender for Slovenian PrvaLiga side Domžale.

Career statistics

Club

Honours

Club
Red Star Belgrade
 Serbian SuperLiga: 2021–22
 Serbian Cup: 2021–22

References

 

2003 births
Living people
Footballers from Belgrade
Serbian footballers
Association football defenders
Red Star Belgrade footballers
RFK Grafičar Beograd players
NK Domžale players
Serbian First League players
Serbian SuperLiga players
Slovenian PrvaLiga players
Serbia youth international footballers
Serbian expatriate footballers
Serbian expatriate sportspeople in Slovenia
Expatriate footballers in Slovenia